Afrops larvifer ("Eye of Africa bearing a mask") is a phacopid trilobite which lived in a marine environment during the Pragian stage in what is now southwestern Algeria. The holotype and only known specimen is an incomplete cephalon that was described by G. Alberti in 1983.

References

External links
 Afrops at the Paleobiology Database

Fossils of Algeria
Phacopidae
Devonian trilobites of Africa